Gottschalkia is a genus of bacteria in the order Tissierellales. The genus was first described from two species previously placed in the genus Clostridium.

References

Bacillota
Taxa described in 2017